Yaakov Dov Bleich (born October 19, 1964) is an American-born rabbi. He serves as Rabbi of the Kyiv synagogue in Podil since 1989. 
Rabbi Bleich was vice-president of the World Jewish Congress from 2009-2017. Bleich chose not to run for re-election as a member of the WJC Executive Committee at the WJC’s May 2021 plenary assembly.

Biography 
Bleich graduated from Telshe Yeshiva High School in Chicago, Illinois where he began his rabbinical studies. From 1984 to 1986, he studied at the Karlin Stolin Rabbinical Institute in Jerusalem.

In November 2014, Bleich strongly criticized Minister of the Interior Arsen Avakov for appointing Vadym Troyan, a former Azov Battalion commander, to the post of police chief of the Kyiv Oblast. Speaking to The Jerusalem Post, Bleich stated that “if the interior minister continues to appoint people of questionable repute and ideologies tainted with fascism and right-wing extremism, the interior minister should be replaced”.

In 2019, Bleich, together with Sviatoslav Shevchuk (Ukrainian Greek Catholic Church) and Epiphanius I of Ukraine (Orthodox Church of Ukraine), held a prayer service for members of the Organization of Ukrainian Nationalists in the Jewish cemetery of Sambir.

On February 27, 2022, Bleich told Arutz Sheva: "President Zelensky called my community a few hours ago, while waging war, and asked the Jewish people should pray for Ukraine. 'The Russians have more soldiers than us, but our soldiers have more determination than the Russians. We need your prayers for us to succeed, the Ukrainian president said."

References

1964 births
Living people
Ukrainian Orthodox rabbis
20th-century Ukrainian rabbis
21st-century Ukrainian rabbis
American Hasidic rabbis
People from Borough Park, Brooklyn